Goodenia helmsii is a species of flowering plant in the family Goodeniaceae and is endemic to inland parts of the south-west of Western Australia. It is an erect or ascending shrub with cylindrical stem leaves and spikes of white flowers with purplish spots.

Description

Taxonomy and naming
This species was first formally described in 1905 by Ernst Georg Pritzel who gave it the name Scaevola helmsii. In 1990 Roger Charles Carolin changed the name to Goodenia helmsii in the journal Telopea. The specific epithet (helmsii) honours the naturalist Richard Helms.

Distribution and habitat
This goodenia grows in gravelly or sandy soil in inland areas of the south-west, in the Avon Wheatbelt, Coolgardie, Jarrah Forest, Mallee, Murchison and Yalgoo biogeographic regions of Western Australia.

Conservation status
Goodenia helmsii is classified as "not threatened" by the Government of Western Australia Department of Parks and Wildlife.

References

helmsii
Eudicots of Western Australia
Plants described in 1905
Taxa named by Ernst Pritzel
Endemic flora of Western Australia